Viral marketing is a business strategy that uses existing social networks to promote a product mainly on various social media platforms. Its name refers to how consumers spread information about a product with other people, much in the same way that a virus spreads from one person to another. It can be delivered by word of mouth, or enhanced by the network effects of the Internet and mobile networks.

The concept is often misused or misunderstood, as people apply it to any successful enough story without taking into account the word "viral".

Viral advertising is personal and, while coming from an identified sponsor, it does not mean businesses pay for its distribution. Most of the well-known viral ads circulating online are ads paid by a sponsor company, launched either on their own platform (company web page or social media profile) or on social media websites such as YouTube. Consumers receive the page link from a social media network or copy the entire ad from a website and pass it along through e-mail or posting it on a blog, web page or social media profile. Viral marketing may take the form of video clips, interactive Flash games, advergames, ebooks, brandable software, images, text messages, email messages, or web pages. The most commonly utilized transmission vehicles for viral messages include pass-along based, incentive based, trendy based, and undercover based. However, the creative nature of viral marketing enables an "endless amount of potential forms and vehicles the messages can utilize for transmission", including mobile devices.

The ultimate goal of marketers interested in creating successful viral marketing programs is to create viral messages that appeal to individuals with high social networking potential (SNP) and that have a high probability of being presented and spread by these individuals and their competitors in their communications with others in a short period.

The term "viral marketing" has also been used pejoratively to refer to stealth marketing campaigns—marketing strategies that advertise a product to people without them knowing they are being marketed to.

History
The emergence of "viral marketing", as an approach to advertisement, has been tied to the popularization of the notion that ideas spread like viruses. The field that developed around this notion, memetics, peaked in popularity in the 1990s. As this then began to influence marketing gurus, it took on a life of its own in that new context.

The brief career of Australian pop singer Marcus Montana is largely remembered as an early example of viral marketing. In early 1989, thousands of posters declaring "Marcus is Coming" were placed around Sydney, generating discussion and interest within the media and the community about the meaning of the mysterious advertisements. The campaign successfully made Montana's musical debut a talking point, but his subsequent music career was a failure.

The term viral strategy was first used in marketing in 1995, in a pre-digital marketing era, by a strategy team at Chiat / Day advertising in LA (now TBWA LA), led by Lorraine Ketch and Fred Satler, for the launch of the first PlayStation for Sony Computer Entertainment. Born from a need to combat huge target cynicism the insight was that people reject things pushed at them but seek out things that elude them. Chiat / Day created a 'stealth' campaign to go after influencers and opinion leaders, using street teams for the first time in brand marketing and layered an intricate omni-channel web of info and intrigue. Insiders picked up on it and spread the word. Within 6 months, PlayStation was number one in its category—Sony's most successful launch in history.

There is debate on the origin and the popularization of the specific term viral marketing, though some of the earliest uses of the current term are attributed to the Harvard Business School graduate Tim Draper and faculty member Jeffrey Rayport. The term was later popularized by Rayport in the 1996 Fast Company article "The Virus of Marketing", and Tim Draper and Steve Jurvetson of the venture capital firm Draper Fisher Jurvetson in 1997 to describe Hotmail's practice of appending advertising to outgoing mail from their users. An earlier attestation of the term is found in PC User magazine in 1989, but with a somewhat differing meaning.

Among the first to write about viral marketing on the Internet was the media critic Doug Rushkoff. The assumption is that if such an advertisement reaches a "susceptible" user, that user becomes "infected" (i.e., accepts the idea) and shares the idea with others "infecting them", in the viral analogy's terms. As long as each infected user shares the idea with more than one susceptible user on average (i.e., the basic reproductive rate is greater than one—the standard in epidemiology for qualifying something as an epidemic), the number of infected users grows according to an exponential curve. Of course, the marketing campaign may be successful even if the message spreads more slowly, if this user-to-user sharing is sustained by other forms of marketing communications, such as public relations or advertising.

Bob Gerstley was among the first to write about algorithms designed to identify people with high "social networking potential." Gerstley employed SNP algorithms in quantitative marketing research. In 2004, the concept of the alpha user was coined to indicate that it had now become possible to identify the focal members of any viral campaign, the "hubs" who were most influential. Alpha users could be targeted for advertising purposes most accurately in mobile phone networks, due to their personal nature.

In early 2013 the first ever Viral Summit was held in Las Vegas. The summit attempted to identify similar trends in viral marketing methods for various media.

What makes things go viral
According to the book Contagious: Why Things Catch On, there are six key factors that drive virality. They are organized in an acronym called STEPPS which stands for:
 Social Currency – the better something makes people look, the more likely they will be to share it
 Triggers – things that are top of mind are more likely to be tip of tongue
 Emotion – when we care, we share
 Public – the easier something is to see, the more likely people are to imitate it
 Practical Value – people share useful information to help others
 Stories – Trojan Horse stories carry messages and ideas along for the ride
The goal of a viral marketing campaign is to widely disseminate marketing content through sharing & liking.

Another important factor that drives virality is the propagativity of the content, referring to the ease with which consumers can redistribute it. This includes the effort required to share the content, the network size and type of the chosen distribution medium, and the proximity of shareable content with its means of redistribution (i.e. a 'Share' button).

Methods and metrics

According to marketing professors Andreas Kaplan and Michael Haenlein, to make viral marketing work, three basic criteria must be met, i.e., giving the right message to the right messengers in the right environment:

Messenger: Three specific types of messengers are required to ensure the transformation of an ordinary message into a viral one: market mavens, social hubs, and salespeople. Market mavens are individuals who are continuously 'on the pulse' of things (information specialists); they are usually among the first to get exposed to the message and who transmit it to their immediate social network. Social hubs are people with an exceptionally large number of social connections; they often know hundreds of different people and have the ability to serve as connectors or bridges between different subcultures. Salespeople might be needed who receive the message from the market maven, amplify it by making it more relevant and persuasive, and then transmit it to the social hub for further distribution. Market mavens may not be particularly convincing in transmitting the information.
Message: Only messages that are both memorable and sufficiently interesting to be passed on to others have the potential to spur a viral marketing phenomenon. Making a message more memorable and interesting or simply more infectious, is often not a matter of major changes but minor adjustments. It should be unique and engaging with a main idea that motivates the recipient to share it widely with friends – a "must-see" element.
Environment: The environment is crucial in the rise of successful viral marketing – small changes in the environment lead to huge results, and people are much more sensitive to environment. The timing and context of the campaign launch must be right.

Whereas Kaplan, Haenlein and others reduce the role of marketers to crafting the initial viral message and seeding it, futurist and sales and marketing analyst Marc Feldman, who conducted IMT Strategies' viral marketing study in 2001, carves a different role for marketers which pushes the 'art' of viral marketing much closer to 'science'.

Metrics
To clarify and organize the information related to potential measures of viral campaigns, the key measurement possibilities should be considered in relation to the objectives formulated for the viral campaign. In this sense, some of the key cognitive outcomes of viral marketing activities can include measures such as the number of views, clicks, and hits for specific content, as well as the number of shares in social media, such as likes on Facebook or retweets on Twitter, which demonstrate that consumers processed the information received through the marketing message. Measures such as the number of reviews for a product or the number of members for a campaign web page quantify the number of individuals who have acknowledged the information provided by marketers. Besides statistics that are related to online traffic, surveys can assess the degree of product or brand knowledge, though this type of measurement is more complicated and requires more resources.

Related to consumers' attitudes toward a brand or even toward the marketing communication, different online and social media statistics, including the number of likes and shares within a social network, can be used. The number of reviews for a certain brand or product and the quality assessed by users are indicators of attitudes. Classical measures of consumer attitude toward the brand can be gathered through surveys of consumers.
Behavioral measures are very important because changes in consumers' behavior and buying decisions are what marketers hope to see through viral campaigns. There are numerous indicators that can be used in this context as a function of marketers' objectives. Some of them include the most known online and social media statistics such as number and quality of shares, views, product reviews, and comments. Consumers' brand engagement can be measured through the K-factor, the number of followers, friends, registered users, and time spent on the website. Indicators that are more bottom-line oriented focus on consumers' actions after acknowledging the marketing content, including the number of requests for information, samples, or test-drives. Nevertheless, responses to actual call-to-action messages are important, including the conversion rate.
Consumers' behavior is expected to lead to contributions to the bottom line of the company, meaning increase in sales, both in quantity and financial amount. However, when quantifying changes in sales, managers need to consider other factors that could potentially affect sales besides the viral marketing activities. Besides positive effects on sales, the use of viral marketing is expected to bring significant reductions in marketing costs and expenses.

Methods 
Viral marketing often involves and utilizes: 
 Customer participation and polling services
 Industry-specific organization contributions
 Web search engines and blogs
 Mobile smartphone integration
 Multiple forms of print and direct marketing
 Target marketing web services
 Search engine optimization (SEO)
 Social media optimization (SMO)
 Television and radio
 Influencer marketing

Viral target marketing is based on three important principles:
 Social profile gathering
 Proximity market analysis
 Real-time key word density analysis

By applying these three important disciplines to an advertising model, a VMS company is able to match a client with their targeted customers at a cost-effective advantage.

The Internet makes it possible for a campaign to go viral very fast; it can, so to speak, make a brand famous overnight. However, the Internet and social media technologies themselves do not make a brand viral; they just enable people to share content to other people faster. Therefore, it is generally agreed that a campaign must typically follow a certain set of guidelines in order to potentially be successful:
 It must be appealing to most of the audience.
 It must be worth sharing with friends and family. 
 A large platform, e.g. YouTube or Facebook must be used.
 An initial boost to gain attention is used, e.g. seeding, buying views, or sharing to Facebook fans.
 The content is of good quality.
 Demographics - It must be correlated with the Region & Society.

Social networking 
The growth of social networks significantly contributed to the effectiveness of viral marketing.  As of 2009, two thirds of the world's Internet population visits a social networking service or blog site at least every week. Facebook alone has over 1 billion active users. In 2009, time spent visiting social media sites began to exceed time spent emailing. A 2010 study found that 52% of people who view news online forward it on through social networks, email, or posts.

Social media 
The introduction of social media has caused a change in how viral marketing is used and the speed at which information is spread and users interact. This has prompted many companies to use social media as a way to market themselves and their products, with Elsamari Botha and Mignon Reyneke stating that viral messages are "playing an increasingly important role in influencing and shifting public opinion on corporate reputations, brands, and products as well as political parties and public personalities to name but a few."

Influencers 
'The influencers in order to communicate marketing messages to the audiences you seek to reach'. In business, it is indicated that people prefer interaction with humans to a logo. Therefore, it seems that influencers are on behalf of a company to build up a relationship between the brand and their customers. Companies would be left behind if they neglected the trend of influencers in viral marketing, as over 60% of global brands have used influencers in marketing in 2016.
The influencer types come along with the level of customers' involvement in companies' marketing. First, unintentional influences, because of brand satisfaction and low involvement, their action is just to deliver a company's message to a potential user. Secondly, users will become salesmen or promoters for a particular company with incentives. For example, ICQ offered their users benefits to create the awareness of their friends. Finally, the mass reached influencers are those who have a huge range of followers on the social network. Recent trend in businesses activity is to offer incentives to individual users for re-posting the advertisement messages to their own profiles.

Marketers and agencies commonly consider celebrities as a good influencer with endorsement work. This conception is similar to celebrity marketing. Based on a survey, 69% of company marketing department and 74% of agencies are currently working with celebrities in the UK. The celebrity types come along with their working environment. Traditional celebrities are considered singers, dancers, actors or models. These types of public characters are continuing to be the most commonly used by company marketers. The survey found that 4 in 10 company having worked with these traditional celebrities in the prior year. However, people these years are spending more time on social media rather than traditional media such as TV. The researchers also claim that customers are not firmly believed celebrities are effectively influential.

Social media stars among a kind of influencer on viral marketing since consumers are spending more time on the Internet than before. And companies and agencies start to consider collaborating with social media stars as their product endorser.

Social media stars such as YouTuber Zoella or Instagrammer Aimee Song are followed by millions of people online. These online celebrities are having more connection and influence with their followers because they have more frequent and realistic conversation and interaction on the Internet in terms of comments or likes.

This trend captured by marketers who are used to explore new potential customers. Agencies are placing social media stars alongside singers and musicians at the top of the heap of celebrity types they had worked with. And there are more than 28% of company marketers having worked with one social media celebrity in the previous year.

Benefits

For companies
Using influencers in viral marketing provides companies several benefits. It enables companies to spend little time and budget on their marketing communication and brand awareness promotion. For example, Alberto Zanot, in the 2006 FIFA Football World Cup, shared Zinedine Zidane's headbutt against Italy and engaged more than 1.5 million viewers in less than the very first hour. Secondly, it enhances the credibility of messages. These trust-based relationships grab the audience's attention, create customers' demand, increase sales and loyalty, or simply drive customers' attitude and behavior. In the case of Coke, Millennials changed their mind about the product, from parents' drink to the beverage for teens. It built up Millennials' social needs by 'sharing a Coke' with their friends. This created a deep connection with Gen Y, dramatically increased sales (+11% compared with last year) and market share (+1.6%).

Benefits for influencers 
No doubt that harnessing influencers would be a lucrative business for both companies and influencers. The concept of 'influencer' is no longer just an 'expert' but also anyone who delivers and influence on the credibility of a message (e.g. blogger) In 2014, BritMums, network sharing family's daily life, had 6,000 bloggers and 11,300 views per month on average and became endorsers for some particular brand such as Coca-Cola, Morrison. Another case, Aimee Song who had over 3.6m followers on the Instagram page and became Laura Mercier's social media influencers, gaining $500,000 monthly.

For consumers
Decision-making process seems to be hard for customers these days. Millers (1956) argued that people suffered from short-term memory. This links to difficulties in customers' decision-making process and Paradox of Choice, as they face various adverts and newspapers daily. 
Influencers serve as a credible source for customers' decision-making process. Neilsen reported that 80% of consumers appreciated a recommendation of their acquaintances, as they have reasons to trust in their friends delivering the messages without benefits and helping them reduce perceived risks behind choices.

Risks of using the wrong influencer

Risks for the company 
The main risk coming from the company is for it to target the wrong influencer or segment. Once the content is online, the sender won't be able to control it anymore. It is therefore vital to aim at a particular segment when releasing the message. This is what happened to the company BlendTech which released videos showing the blender could blend anything, and encouraged users to share videos. This mainly caught the attention of teenage boys who thought it funny to blend and destroy anything they could; even though the videos went viral, they did not target potential buyers of the product. This is considered to be one of the major factors that affects the success of the online promotion. It is critical and inevitable for the organisations to target the right audience. Another risk with internet is that a company's video could end up going viral on the other side of the planet where their products are not even for sale.

Risks emanating from the influencers 
According to a paper by Duncan Watts and colleagues entitled: "Everyone's an influencer", the most common risk in viral marketing is that of the influencer not passing on the message, which can lead to the failure of the viral marketing campaign. A second risk is that the influencer modifies the content of the message. A third risk is that influencers pass on the wrong message. This can result from a misunderstanding or as a deliberate move.

Notable examples 

Between 1996 and 1997, Hotmail was one of the first internet businesses to become extremely successful utilizing viral marketing techniques by inserting the tagline "Get your free e-mail at Hotmail" at the bottom of every e-mail sent out by its users. Hotmail was able to sign up 12 million users in 18 months. At the time, this was historically the fastest growth of any user based media company. By the time Hotmail reached 66 million users, the company was establishing 270,000 new accounts each day.

In 2000, Slate.com described TiVo's unpublicized gambit of giving free systems to web-savvy enthusiasts to create "viral" word of mouth, pointing out that a viral campaign differs from a publicity stunt.

Burger King has used several marketing campaigns. Its The Subservient Chicken campaign, running from 2004 until 2007, was an example of viral or word-of-mouth marketing.

The Blendtec viral video series Will It Blend? debuted in 2006. In the show, Tom Dickson, Blendtec founder and CEO, attempts to blend various unusual items in order to show off the power of his blender. Will it Blend? has been nominated for the 2007 YouTube award for Best Series, winner of .Net Magazine's 2007 Viral Video campaign of the year and winner of the Bronze level Clio Award for Viral Video in 2008.  In 2010, Blendtec claimed the top spot on the AdAge list of "Top 10 Viral Ads of All Time". The Will It Blend page on YouTube currently shows over 200 million video views.

The Big Word Project, launched in 2008, aimed to redefine the Oxford English Dictionary by allowing people to submit their website as the definition of their chosen word.  The project, created to fund two Masters students' educations, attracted the attention of bloggers worldwide, and was featured on Daring Fireball and Wired Magazine.

Companies may also be able to use a viral video that they did not create for marketing purposes.  A notable example is the viral video "The Extreme Diet Coke & Mentos Experiments" created by Fritz Grobe and Stephen Voltz of EepyBird.  After the initial success of the video, Mentos was quick to offer its support.  They shipped EepyBird thousands of mints for their experiments.  Coke was slower to get involved.

On March 6, 2012, Dollar Shave Club launched their online video campaign. In the first 48 hours of their video debuting on YouTube they had over 12,000 people signing up for the service. The video cost just $4500 to make and as of November 2015 has had more than 21 million views. The video was considered one of the best viral marketing campaigns of 2012 and won "Best Out-of-Nowhere Video Campaign" at the 2012 AdAge Viral Video Awards.

In 2014, A.L.S. Ice Bucket Challenge was among the best viral marketing challenges examples in the social network. Millions of people on the social media started filming themselves, pouring a bucket of ice water over their heads and sharing the video with their friends. The challenge was created to give support for fighting amyotrophic lateral sclerosis (ALS), also called Lou Gehrig's disease. People finished the challenge and then nominated the next person they knew on the social media to take the same challenge. By following this trend, Ice Bucket Challenge became a 'fab' on social media with many online celebrities such as Tyler Oakley, Zoe Sugg and huge celebrities and entrepreneurs like Justin Bieber, Mark Zuckerberg and Bill Gates participating. Until September 2014, over 2.4 million ice bucket-related videos had been posted on Facebook, and 28 million people had uploaded, commented on or liked ice bucket-related posts. And about 3.7 million videos had been uploaded on Instagram with the hashtags #ALSicebucketchallenge and #icebucketchallenge. The ALS association didn't invent the ice bucket challenge, but they received a huge amount of donation from this activity. It raised a reported $220 million worldwide for A.L.S. organisations, and this amount is thirteen times as much donation as what it had in the whole preceding year in just eight weeks.

In mid 2016, an Indian tea company (TE-A-ME) has delivered 6,000 tea bags to Donald Trump and launched a video on YouTube. and Facebook The video campaign received various awards including most creative PR stunt in Southeast Asia after receiving 52000+ video shares, 3.1M video view in first 72-hour and hundreds of publication mentions (including Mashable, Quartz,  Indian Express, Buzzfeed) across 80+ countries.

Ghostface Real Estate Listing

In Autumn 2019, a real estate listing for a century-old home in Lansing, Michigan went viral when the listing agent (James Pyle) used the Ghostface character from the Scream movie in marketing photos that showcased the home on Realtor.com and Zillow. The listing went live on September 27, 2019, and quickly began trending on Facebook, garnering 300,000 views in 2 days, at which point a story on the unusual popularity of the listing appeared in a local newspaper. Pyle stated that wanted to do something fun and novel for the Halloween season but to keep the photos professional at the same time, and hired photographer Bradley Johnson to take several pictures of him dressed as Ghostface raking leaves in the backyard, preparing to carve a pumpkin in the kitchen, standing on the front and back porches, and peeking out behind curtains and doors. The following day, the story was picked up by several radio stations, including K102.5 in Kalamazoo, WCRZ in Burton, WOMC and ALT97 in Detroit, as well as the Metro Times newspaper in Detroit. Following the increased attention on the Zillow listing, over the next few days the story appeared on major news networks.
Pyle stated that a normal listing typically received under 150 views, and his goal was to get between 500 and 1,000 views of the home. However, the Zillow listing ended up receiving over 20,000 views by October 1, one million views by October 2 and exceeded 1.2 million views by October 3. It was estimated that the combined views of the listings on both sites (Zillow and Realtor.com) exceeded 5 million in 5 days. The listing received a cash offer within 4 days and the immense popularity resulted in the home becoming overbooked during the open house and subsequent viewings. Due to the success of the listing, Pyle was scheduled to appear on “Good Morning America” on October 2, 2019. He was quoted as saying that he didn't think he would ever be able to duplicate the success of the listing, but he planned to try some additional variations for future listings. The listing continued to be popular even after the house was off the market. This approach was so successful that it became a recommended practice on Realtor.com.

See also
Clickbait
Growth hacking
Guerrilla marketing
Internet marketing
K-factor (marketing)
Social video marketing
Viral phenomenon
Visual marketing
Mobile marketing
Spotify Wrapped

References 

 
Social media
Cultural trends
Advertising techniques
Memetics
1990s neologisms
Promotion and marketing communications
Publicity stunts
Social influence